The legal system of Uruguay belongs to the Continental Law tradition.

The basis for its public law is the 1967 Constitution, amended in 1989, 1994, 1996, and 2004. According to it, Uruguay is a democratic republic. There is a clear separation of functions, between the President of the Republic, the Legislative Power and the Judiciary.

On the other hand, private relationships are governed by the Uruguayan Civil Code, which was first published in 1868, thanks to the work of Tristán Narvaja.

Constitution

Civil law

Private international law 
In matter of private international law or conflict of laws, the legal system of Uruguay is comprised by international treaties ratified by the country and domestic laws. Uruguay signed and ratified a number of treaties on conflict of laws from several international forums: such treaties from the Hague Conference on Private International Law at an international level, from the Inter-American Specialized Conferences on Private International Law of the Organization of American States at a continental level and from the MERCOSUR at a regional level.

Regarding the domestic law, the core law on conflicts of law is the new General Law on Private International Law number 19920, that replaced the old system of the Appendix to the Final Title of the Uruguayan Civil Code, established by Law number 10084 of 1941, updating and expanding the coverage of the domestic system of private international law that works in the situation of a lack of an international treaty on the matter in the specific case.

See also
Legal systems of the world
Politics of Uruguay
History of Uruguay
Supreme Court of Uruguay

References

External links
 Search laws by number - Parliament of Uruguay 
 IMPO - National Directorate of Official Publications 
 Legal Framework - Office of the President 
 El Derecho Digital 
 La Ley Online 

 
Law in South America